The 2013 Marshall Thundering Herd football team represented Marshall University in the 2013 NCAA Division I FBS football season. They were led by fourth-year head coach Doc Holliday and played their home games at Joan C. Edwards Stadium. They were a member of the East Division of Conference USA. They finished the season 10–4, 7–1 in C-USA play to win the East Division title. As East Division champions, they played West Division champions Rice in the C-USA Championship Game, losing to the Owls 24–41. They were invited to the Military Bowl where they defeated Maryland 31–20.

Schedule

Game summaries

Miami (OH)

This was the 42nd time these two teams have faced each other, both in the Buckeye Conference (1933–1939) and in the Mid-American Conference (1953–1968; 1997–2004) over the years. Miami leads the overall win–loss record 29–11–1. The last times these two teams faced each other was in 2004, a 33–25 win over the RedHawks at the Joan C. Edwards Stadium.

Gardner-Webb

This was the first time these two teams had faced each other.

Ohio

This was the fifty seventh time these two teams had faced each other. Ohio leads the overall win–loss record 31–19–6. Previously, the last time these two teams faced each other was in 2012.

Virginia Tech

This will be the eleventh time these two teams have faced each other. Virginia Tech leads the overall win–loss record 8–2. The last times these two teams faced each other was in 2011.

UTSA

This will be the first time these two schools have faced each other.

Florida Atlantic

This will be the first time these two teams have faced each other.

Middle Tennessee

This will be the third time these two teams have faced each other. Marshall leads the overall win–loss record 2–0. The last meeting between Marshall and Middle Tennessee was in 1994, when both schools were still in what was then known as Division I-AA (now FCS).

Southern Miss

This will be the ninth time these two teams have faced each other. Southern Miss leads the overall win–loss record 5–3. The last times these two teams faced each other was in 2012, when Southern Miss slipped from the Conference USA championship in 2011 to 0–12 last season. Marshall picked up its second win in Hattiesburg, Miss. at M. M. Roberts Stadium, 59–24.

UAB

This will be the ninth time these two teams have faced each other. Marshall leads the overall win–loss record 6–2. The last times these two teams faced each other was in 2012, a 38–31 UAB win at Legion Field in Birmingham, Ala.

Tulsa

This will be the fifth time these two teams have faced each other. Tulsa leads the overall win–loss record 4–0. The last times these two teams faced each other was in 2012, a 45–38 TU win at the Joan C. Edwards Stadium. Tulsa won Conference USA in 2012, and Marshall plays at TU for the second time in three seasons.

FIU

This will be the second time these two teams have faced each other. Marshall leads the overall win–loss record 1–0. The last times these two teams faced each other was in 2011 in the Beef 'O'Brady's Bowl St. Petersburg (Fla.) at Tropicana Field, a 20–10 Thundering Herd win.

East Carolina

This will be the fifteenth time these two teams have faced each other. East Carolina leads the overall win–loss record 10–4. The last time these two teams faced each other was in 2012.

Rice

This will be the fifth time these two teams have faced each other. Marshall lead the overall series 3–1. The last time these two teams faced each other was in 2012 at Houston. Marshall won that game 54–51 in double overtime.

Maryland–Military Bowl

This will be the first time these two teams have faced each other.

References

Marshall
Marshall Thundering Herd football seasons
Military Bowl champion seasons
Marshall Thundering Herd football